Lenn De Smet (born 12 April 2004) is a Belgian footballer who currently plays as a forward for Club NXT. He is the twin brother of teammate Liam De Smet.

Career statistics

Club

Notes

References

2004 births
Living people
Belgian footballers
Belgium youth international footballers
Association football forwards
Challenger Pro League players
Club Brugge KV players
Club NXT players